The 2016–17 season was Sporting de Gijón's 111th season in existence and the club's 42nd season in the top flight of Spanish football. It covered a period from 1 July 2016 to 30 June 2017.

Season overview
Despite earning seven points in the first three games, a streak of five losses dropped Real Sporting to the relegation positions. The club was unable to leave them during the rest of the season and finally was relegated to Segunda División despite winning 1–0 at Ipurua.

Players

Current squad

From the reserve team

In

Out

Technical staff

Managerial changes

Pre-season and friendlies

Competitions

La Liga

League table

Results summary

Results by round

Matches

Copa del Rey

Statistics

Appearances and goals

|-
|colspan="12"|Players who have left the club after the start of the season:

Disciplinary record

|-
|colspan=14 align=left|Players who have left the club after the start of the season:

Notes

References

External links

Sporting de Gijón seasons
Sporting de Gijon
Sporting de Gijon